The 2018–19 Arizona Coyotes season was the 40th season for the National Hockey League (NHL) franchise that was established on June 22, 1979, the 23rd season since the franchise relocated from Winnipeg following the 1995–96 NHL season, and the 47th overall, including the World Hockey Association years. On April 4, 2019, the Coyotes were eliminated from playoff contention after the Colorado Avalanche's 3–2 overtime win against the Winnipeg Jets.

Standings

Schedule and results

Preseason
The preseason schedule was published on June 13, 2018.

Regular season
The regular season schedule was  released on June 21, 2018.

Player statistics
As of April 6, 2019

Skaters

Goaltenders

†Denotes player spent time with another team before joining the Coyotes. Stats reflect time with the Coyotes only.
‡Denotes player was traded mid-season. Stats reflect time with the Coyotes only.
Bold/italics denotes franchise record.

Transactions
The Coyotes have been involved in the following transactions during the 2018–19 season.

Trades

Free agents

Waivers

Contract terminations

Retirement

Signings

Draft picks

Below are the Arizona Coyotes' selections at the 2018 NHL Entry Draft, which was held on June 22 and 23, 2018, at the American Airlines Center in Dallas, Texas.

Notes:
 The Minnesota Wild's second-round pick went to the Arizona Coyotes as the result of a trade on February 26, 2017, that sent Martin Hanzal, Ryan White and a fourth-round pick in 2017 to Minnesota in exchange for Grayson Downing, a first-round pick in 2017, a conditional fourth-round pick in 2019 and this pick.
 The Carolina Hurricanes' third-round pick went to the Arizona Coyotes as the result of a trade on May 3, 2018, that sent Jordan Martinook and a fourth-round pick in 2018 to Carolina in exchange for Marcus Kruger and this pick.
 The San Jose Sharks' fourth-round and fifth-round picks went to the Arizona Coyotes as the result of a trade on June 23, 2018, that sent Toronto's third-round pick in 2018 (87th overall) to San Jose in exchange for their 2018 fourth-round pick (114th overall) and fifth-round pick (145th overall). Arizona had acquired Toronto's third-round pick in a trade for the Calgary Flames' third-round pick (74th overall), which the Coyotes had as the result of a trade on June 17, 2017, that sent Mike Smith to Calgary in exchange for Chad Johnson, Brandon Hickey and this pick (being conditional at the time of the trade).
 The Columbus Blue Jackets' fifth-round pick went to the Arizona Coyotes as the result of a trade on June 23, 2018, that sent Calgary's third-round pick in 2018 (74th overall) to Chicago in exchange for Toronto's third-round pick in 2018 (87th overall) and this pick.

References

Arizona Coyotes seasons
Arizona Coyotes
Arizona Coyotes
Arizona Coyotes